Marienhafe is a railway station located in Marienhafe, Germany. The station is located on the Emsland Railway. The train services are operated by Deutsche Bahn.

Train services
The following services currently call at the station:

Intercity services (IC 56) Norddeich - Emden - Leer - Bremen - Hannover - Braunschweig - Magdeburg - Leipzig
Regional services  Norddeich - Emden - Oldenburg - Bremen - Nienburg - Hanover

References

Railway stations in Lower Saxony